Randhir Singh may refer to:

 Randhir Singh of Kapurthala (1831–1870), ruler of the Indian princely state of Kapurthala
 Randhir Singh of Bharatpur (died 1823), ruler of the Indian princely state of Bharatpur
 Randhir Singh (Sikh) (1878–1961), regarded by many Sikhs as a Saint
 Randhir Singh (sport shooter) (born 1946), Olympic-level trap and skeet shooter and sports administrator
 Randhir Singh (cricketer) (1957–2023), Indian cricketer
 Randhir Singh (academic) (1922–2016), Indian political theorist
 Randhir Kumar Singh (born 1982), Indian politician
 Randhir Singh (Jammu and Kashmir politician) (active from 1972), see Billawar (Vidhan Sabha constituency)

See also 
 Randhir (disambiguation)